Edward John Wherry III (known professionally as John Wherry) is an American immunologist. He is the Richard and Barbara Schiffrin President's Distinguished Professor and department chair of Systems Pharmacology and Translational Therapeutics at the University of Pennsylvania. He is also the director of the Penn Institute for Immunology.

Education 
Wherry received his B.S. degree in science from The Pennsylvania State University in 1993 and his Ph.D. in immunology from Thomas Jefferson University in 2000. He completed his thesis on the effect of epitope density on CD8+ cell priming under the mentorship of Laurence "Ike" Eisenlohr.

Academic posts  
Wherry continued on to a postdoctoral fellowship with Rafi Ahmed at Emory University from 2000 to 2004. After completing his postdoc, he joined The Wistar Institute as an assistant professor where he remained until 2010. He then joined the department of Microbiology at the University of Pennsylvania's Perelman School of Medicine. He served as the chair of the Immunology Graduate Group (IGG) from 2011 to 2013 and remains on the IGG Executive Committee. In 2012 he was appointed as director of the Institute for Immunology (IFI). Wherry was named the inaugural Richard and Barbara Schiffrin President's Distinguished Professor in 2017. A year later, Wherry was appointed as chair of the Systems Pharmacology and Translational Therapeutics department.

Research  
Wherry's research has focused on the field of T cell exhaustion, elucidating mechanisms that attenuate T cell responses during chronic infections and cancer. His discoveries include characterizing several immunological checkpoints and T cell states that can be targeted to re-invigorate exhausted T cells. Wherry's lab has played a prominent role in understanding the concept of human immune health using high-dimensional, integrative, translational immunology approaches.

Awards and honors 
 2018: Stand Up To Cancer Phillip A. Sharp Award
 2016: Cancer Research Institute's Frederick W. Alt Award for New Discoveries in Immunology
 2014 & 2016: Highly Cited Research and Rising Star by Thomson/Reuters ISI
 2014: "World's Most Influential Scientific Minds" Award by Thomson Reuters
 2014: Dr. Wherry received the distinguished Alumni Award from the Thomas Jefferson University Graduate School of Biomedical Sciences
 2007: "America's Young Innovators-37 under 36" by the Smithsonian Magazine
 2006: New Scholar in Aging award from the Ellison Medical Foundation

References

External links 
 Cancer Immunotherapy 101 with Dr. E. John Wherry YouTube. October 9, 2020.
 "Immune Profiling of Hospitalized COVID-19 Patients" by Dr. John Wherry YouTube. June 17, 2020.
 BBC x Penn Medicine: Dr. John Wherry YouTube. May 6, 2019.
 Wherry Lab website at University of Pennsylvania

American immunologists
University of Pennsylvania faculty
Pennsylvania State University alumni
Thomas Jefferson University alumni
Emory University alumni
Year of birth missing (living people)
Living people